Patrick Njiru (born 12 July 1957)  is a former Kenyan rally driver with Subaru World Rally Team from 1983 to 2002. He has retired from competitive racing but often takes part in organizing and competing in charity races like the November 2011 Race4Change in Kenya.

References

1957 births
Kenyan rally drivers
World Rally Championship drivers
Living people